Dulab-e Pain (also Romanized as Dūlāb-e Pā’īn) is a village in Shurab Rural District, in the Central District of Arsanjan County, Fars Province, Iran. At the 2006 census, its population was 101, in 18 families.

References 

Populated places in Arsanjan County